Gholamhossein Gheybparvar is a senior officer in the Revolutionary Guards who formerly commanded Basij forces.

References

Living people
Islamic Revolutionary Guard Corps brigadier generals
Islamic Revolutionary Guard Corps personnel of the Iran–Iraq War
Islamic Revolutionary Guard Corps personnel of the Syrian civil war
Year of birth missing (living people)